Calosoma cyaneoventre is a species of ground beetle in the subfamily of Carabinae. It was described by Mandl in 1995.

References

cyaneoventre
Beetles described in 1995